Psyllium , or ispaghula , is the common name used for several members of the plant genus Plantago whose seeds are used commercially for the production of mucilage. Psyllium is mainly used as a dietary fiber to relieve symptoms of both constipation and mild diarrhea, and occasionally as a food thickener. Allergy to psyllium is common in workers frequently exposed to the substance.

Use of psyllium in the diet for three weeks or longer may lower blood cholesterol levels in people with elevated cholesterol, and may lower blood glucose levels in people with type 2 diabetes. Use of psyllium for a month or longer may produce a small reduction in systolic blood pressure.

The plants from which the seeds are extracted tolerate dry and cool climates, and are mainly cultivated in northern India.

Uses

Food
Psyllium has been used as a thickener in ice cream and other frozen desserts. A 1.5% weight/volume ratio of psyllium mucilage exhibits binding properties that are superior to a 10% weight/volume ratio of starch mucilage.

Human health

Weight loss 
Dietary supplements containing psyllium are sold mainly to aid weight loss, although there is little scientific evidence for such effects.

Constipation
Psyllium is mainly used as a viscous, soluble dietary fiber that is not absorbed by the small intestine. The purely mechanical action of psyllium mucilage is to absorb excess water while stimulating normal bowel elimination. Although its main use has been as a laxative, it is more accurately regarded as a dietary fiber and as such can help reduce the symptoms of both constipation and mild diarrhea. The laxative properties of psyllium are attributed to the fiber: it absorbs water and subsequently softens the stool. It increases flatulence (gas) to some degree.

High blood cholesterol
In 1998, the U.S. Food and Drug Administration approved a health claim on food labels for dietary psyllium as a soluble fiber – if consumed regularly – that would reduce the risk of heart disease by lowering blood cholesterol. Clinical research demonstrated that seven grams or more per day of soluble fiber from psyllium seed husk would sufficiently lower total cholesterol and low density lipoprotein cholesterol in people with hypercholesterolemia, two accepted biomarkers for risk of coronary heart disease. The findings were later confirmed in a meta-analysis that incorporated more evidence. To be eligible for the FDA-allowed health claim, one serving of a manufactured food or dietary supplement must contain at least 1.7 g of psyllium as soluble fiber. Whole oats, barley and foods containing beta-glucan soluble fiber were included as eligible sources for the label claim.

Type 2 diabetes
In 2014, the U.S. Food and Drug Administration approved a qualified health claim for psyllium as a possible benefit for people with diabetes, requiring FDA-approved wording on a product label: "Psyllium husk may reduce the risk of type 2 diabetes, although the FDA has concluded that there is very little scientific evidence for this claim." A meta-analysis published after the FDA decision reported that psyllium provided before meals improved fasting blood glucose and glycated hemoglobin, but that the larger effect was seen in people diagnosed with and being treated for type 2 diabetes, and only a modest improvement for people classified as pre-diabetic.

Hypertension 
Psyllium has been found by meta-analysis of clinical trials to significantly reduce blood pressure in people suffering from hypertension. Psyllium has not been shown to have the same effect on individuals with normal or elevated blood pressure.

Veterinary medicine
Psyllium fiber dietary supplements are used in veterinary medicine to treat sand impaction in horses to aid in elimination of sand from the horse's colon.

Adverse effects
Fiber generally has few side effects.
 Psyllium can cause bowel obstructions or bezoars, if taken without adequate amounts of water.
 Gas or stomach bloating may also occur.
 Choking is a hazard if psyllium is taken without adequate water as it thickens in the throat.

Allergy
Psyllium can cause allergic reactions, including anaphylaxis. Psyllium may act as a potent inhalant allergen capable of eliciting asthma symptoms. Health care professionals at geriatric care hospitals, who are frequently exposed to psyllium in the laxatives administered to patients, are commonly IgE sensitized to psyllium (13.8%), and 8.6% have clinical allergy to psyllium. Pharmaceutical manufacturing employees who have been exposed to psyllium during the processing have developed occupational asthma and IgE sensitization. In order to protect sensitized workers, psyllium has an extremely low occupational exposure limit of 150 ng/m3.

Mechanism of action
The soluble fiber in psyllium is the polysaccharide heteroxylan, a hemicellulose.

Psyllium is produced mainly for its mucilage content. The term mucilage describes a group of clear, colorless, gelling agents derived from plants. The mucilage obtained from psyllium comes from the seed coat. Mucilage is obtained by mechanical milling (i.e. grinding) of the outer layer of the seed. Mucilage yield amounts to about 25% (by weight) of the total seed yield. Plantago-seed mucilage is often referred to as husk, or psyllium husk. The milled seed mucilage is a white fibrous material that is hydrophilic, meaning that its molecular structure causes it to attract and bind to water. Upon absorbing water, the clear, colorless, mucilaginous gel that forms increases in volume by tenfold or more.

Cultivation
The genus Plantago contains over 200 species. P. ovata and P. psyllium are produced commercially in several European countries, Russia and surrounding countries, and India. Plantago seed, known commercially as black, French, or Spanish psyllium, is obtained from P. psyllium, also known as P. arenaria. Seed produced from P. ovata is known in trading circles as white or blonde psyllium, Indian plantago, or isabgol. Isabgol is the common name in India for P. ovata. it is known as Ispaghol in Pakistan. India dominates the world market in the production and export of psyllium.

Leaves are opposite, linear or linear lanceolate . The root system has a well-developed tap root with few fibrous secondary roots. A large number of flowering shoots arise from the base of the plant. Flowers are numerous, small, and white. Plants flower about 60 days after planting. The seeds are enclosed in capsules that open at maturity.

The fields are generally irrigated prior to seeding to achieve ideal soil moisture, to enhance seed soil contact, and to avoid burying the seed too deeply as a result of later irrigations or rainfall. Maximum germination occurs at a seeding depth of 6 mm (1/4 in). Emerging seedlings are frost sensitive; therefore, planting should be delayed until conditions are expected to remain frost free. Seed is broadcast at 5.5 to 8.25 kg/hectare (5 to 7.5 lb/acre) in India. In Arizonan trials, seeding rates of 22 to 27.5 kg/ha (20 to 25 lb/acre) resulted in stands of 1 plant/25mm (1 inch) in 15 cm (6 inch) rows produced excellent yields. Weed control is normally achieved by one or two hand weedings early in the growing season. Control of weeds by pre-plant irrigation that germinates weed seeds followed by shallow tillage may be effective on fields with minimal weed pressure. Psyllium is a poor competitor with most weed species.

Plantago wilt (Fusarium oxysporum) and downy mildew (Peronospora alta) are the major diseases of Isabgol. White grubs and aphids are the major insect pests.

The flower spikes turn reddish brown at ripening, the lower leaves dry and the upper leaves yellow. The crop is harvested in the morning after the dew is gone to minimize shattering and field losses. In India, mature plants are cut 15 cm above the ground and then bound, left for a few days to dry, thrashed, and winnowed.

Harvested seed must be dried to below 12% moisture to allow for cleaning, milling, and storage. Seed stored for future crops has shown a significant loss in viability after 2 years in storage.

Commercial history

Metamucil
Introduced in 1934 by G. D. Searle & Company, Metamucil was acquired by Procter & Gamble in 1985. The name is a combination of the Greek word for change (meta) and the class of fiber that it utilizes (mucilage). In its early years, Metamucil achieved sporadic drug-store distribution as a "behind the counter" product - sold in pharmacies but not on the shelf, so that the pharmacist may counsel the purchaser on correct usage. Since 1974, the brand was also marketed to consumers by print and TV advertising and became available in food outlets. Flavored versions were added in 1979.

The brand is sold as powdered drink mixes, capsules and wafers in a variety of flavors. Metamucil contains psyllium seed husks as the active ingredient. It is manufactured in Phoenix, Arizona, by Procter & Gamble. When first marketed to consumers in 1974, Metamucil was marketed as a laxative. The advertising slogan at that time was "If not nature, then Metamucil". Procter & Gamble sought to make Metamucil a household name by advertising in magazines and on television, using the claim "All fiber is not created equal".

References

External links
 USDA Plants Profile: Plantago ovata Forsk.
 USDA Germplasm Resources Information Network: Plantago ovata Forsk.
 ITIS Standard Report: Plantago ovata Forsk.
 USDA Plants Profile: Plantago psyllium L.
 USDA Germplasm Resources Information Network: Plantago psyllium L. (Plantago arenaria)

Crops
Medicinal plants
Plantago
Edible thickening agents
Natural gums